Vishna is a village in Ruen Municipality, in Burgas Province, in southeastern Bulgaria.

Vishna Pass in Antarctica is named after the village.

References

Villages in Burgas Province